Renée Morisset,  (June 13, 1928 – May 3, 2009) was a Canadian pianist. She and her husband, Victor Bouchard, were one of the foremost piano duos in Canadian classical music.

Honours
Morisset was a pupil of Georges-Émile Tanguay. In 1964, she and her husband were awarded the Prix Calixa-Lavallée. In 1981, she and her husband were made Members of the Order of Canada in recognition of having "contributed to" Canada's "musical life by attracting attention to the works of Canadian composers - works that were composed especially for them - and through their participation in various cultural organizations". In 1985, they were promoted to Officers. In 1994, they were made Knights of the National Order of Quebec.

References

1928 births
2009 deaths
Canadian classical pianists
Canadian women pianists
Classical piano duos
Knights of the National Order of Quebec
Officers of the Order of Canada
20th-century classical pianists
20th-century Canadian pianists
Women classical pianists
20th-century Canadian women musicians
20th-century women pianists